Akeem Sirleaf (born 10 March 1997) is a Liberian athlete who competes and holds national records in the 200m and 400m. In July 2019 he was announced as being selected for the Liberian team for the 2020 Tokyo Olympics.

References

External links
 

1997 births
Living people
Liberian male sprinters
North Carolina A&T Aggies men's track and field athletes
Liberian expatriate sportspeople in the United States